Thriambeutis is a genus of moths of the Heliodinidae family.

Species
Thriambeutis coryphaea Meyrick 1912  (from the Philippines)
Thriambeutis deuterarcha  Meyrick 1938  
Thriambeutis hemicausta  Meyrick 1910   (from the Solomon Islands)
Thriambeutis melanocephala  Diakonoff 1948

References
www.nhm.ac.uk Genus database

Heliodinidae

sv:Thriambeutis coryphaea